The Individual Speedway Norwegian Championship is an annual speedway event held each year organized by the Norges Motorsportforbund (NMF). The first championship was held in 1938 in Trondheim and saw Ragnar C. Erichsen as winner. Lars Gunnestad has won the highest number of championships with ten victories between 1988 and 2003.

Previous winners
The list is incomplete

See also
 Norway national speedway team
 Speedway Grand Prix of Norway

References

Speedway in Norway
Norway
National championships in Norway